Hartlaubella is a genus of cnidarians belonging to the family Campanulariidae.

The species of this genus are found in Europe and Northern America.

Species:

Hartlaubella gelatinosa

References

Campanulariidae
Hydrozoan genera